Pyar Ke Saat Vachan Dharampatnii or Dharampatnii is an Indian Hindi-language drama television series that premiered on 28 November 2022 on Colors TV and is digitally available on Voot. Produced by Ekta Kapoor under Balaji Telefilms, it stars Fahmaan Khan and Kritika Singh Yadav.

Cast

Main
 Fahmaan Khan as Ravi Amardeep Randhawa: Amardeep and Mandeep's son; Amaira's elder brother; Beeji's grandson; Vikrant, Dolly, Gurmeet and Harneet's nephew; Aditya and Nupur's cousin; Keerti and Kavya's former fiancé; Pratiksha's husband (2022–present)
 Kritika Singh Yadav as Pratiksha Ravi Randhawa (née Parekh) : Bharvi and Jignesh's eldest daughter; Kinjal and Parul's elder sister; Prateek and Hansa's niece; Dhaval and Malhar's former fiancée; Ravi's wife (2022–present)

Recurring 

 Akash Jagga as Malhar Thakur: Prateek and Hansa's nephew; Pratiksha's former fiancé; Keerti's murderer
 Gurpreet Bedi as Keerti Gulshan Sachdev: Gulshan and Manvi's elder daughter; Ravi's former fiancée; Kavya's elder sister (2022–2023) (dead)
 Syed Ashraf Karim as Jignesh Parekh – Bharvi's husband, Pratiksha, Kinjal and Parul's father, Prateek's elder brother (2022) (dead) 
 Tasneem Khan as Kinjal Jignesh Parekh – Jignesh and Bharvi's second daughter, Pratiksha's younger sister;Parul's elder sister; Prateek and Hansa's niece
 Utkarsha Naik as Hansa Prateek Parekh – Prateek's wife, Pratiksha, Kinjal , Parul and Malhar's aunt 
 Vijay Badlani as Prateek Parekh – Hansa's husband, Pratiksha, Kinjal and Parul's uncle, Jignesh's younger brother 
 Rose Khan as Parul Jignesh Parekh – Jignesh and Bharvi's youngest daughter, Pratiksha and Kinjal's younger sister; Prateek and Hansa's niece
 Aditi Shetty as Kavya Gulshan Sachdev — Gulshan and Manvi's younger daughter; Keerti’s younger sister; Ravi's former fiancée
 Amit Singh Thakur as Amardeep Randhawa — Beeji's elder son; Vikrant and Harneet's elder brother; Ravi and Amaira's father; Mandeep's husband; Aditya and Nupur's uncle
 Shireen Mirza as Mandeep Amardeep Randhawa — Amardeep's wife; Ravi and Amaira's mother; Aditya and Nupur's aunt
 Ashita Dhawan as Dolly Vikrant Randhawa: Vikrant's wife; Nupur's mother; Ravi,Aditya and Amaira's aunt
 Neha Prajapati as Harneet Gurmeet Dhillon (née Randhawa): Gurmeet's wife; Amardeep and Vikrant's younger sister; Aditya's mother; Ravi, Amaira and Nupur's aunt
 Bobby Khanna as Vikrant Randhawa:Beeji's younger son; Amardeep's younger brother; Harneet's elder brother; Dolly's husband; Nupur's father; Ravi,Aditya and Amaira's uncle
 Saurabh Agarwal as Gurmeet Dhillon: Harneet's husband, Aditya's father; Ravi, Amaira and Nupur's uncle
 Daljeet Soundh as Beeji: Amardeep, Vikrant and Harneet's mother; Ravi,Aditya, Amaira and Nupur's grandmother
 Manasi Bhanushali as Nupur Vikrant Randhawa: Vikrant and Dolly's daughter; Ravi,Aditya and Amaira's cousin; Amardeep, Mandeep, Gurmeet and Harneet's niece
 Nitin Bhatia as Aditya Gurmeet Dhillon - Gurmeet and Harneet's son; Ravi, Amaira and Nupur's cousin; Amardeep, Mandeep,Gurmeet and Harneet's nephew
 Riya Bhattacharjee as Amaira Amardeep Randhawa:Amardeep and Mandeep's daughter;Ravi's younger sister; Aditya and Nupur's cousin; Vikrant, Dolly, Gurmeet and Harneet's niece
 Naveen Saini as Gulshan Sachdev: Manvi's husband; Keerti and Kavya's father
 Dhruvee Haldankar as Manvi Gulshan Sachdev: Gulshan's wife;Keerti and Kavya's mother
 Priya Banerjee / Shalini Mahal

Production

Casting
Fahmaan Khan was cast to portray the lead, Ravi. While, Kritika Singh Yadav was cast to portray the lead, Pratiksha.

Akash Jagga and Gurpreet Bedi were cast as the parallel leads Malhar and Keerti respectively.

Release
Pyar Ke Saat Vachan Dharampatnii's first promo was released on 5 November 2022.

See also
 List of programmes broadcast by Colors TV

References

External links
 Dharampatnii on Colors TV
 Dharampatnii on Voot

Colors TV original programming
2022 Indian television series debuts
Hindi-language television shows